The Battle between the Hermunduri and the Chatti, popularly known as the Salt Battle was fought in Germania in 58 AD between the Chatti and the Hermunduri, both Germanic tribes.

History
It is described in the Annals by the Roman historian Tacitus. The battle was a result of a border dispute between two Germanic tribes, the Chatti and the Hermunduri. Both claimed a river (most likely the Main river), as their own. The river had special religious significance and was also good for the extraction of salt through possession of some salt springs. The battle seem to have been a result of the Marcomanni, who, led by Maroboduus (who had died in 37 A.D.) had left the area vacant and had headed toward Bohemia, in order to avoid being within the range of the Roman influence. The Chatti pushed southward and the Hermunduri attacked northward. The battle, which lasted all summer of 58 A.D., resulted in a victory to the Hermunduri and all the Chatti were slain.

References

Sources
 Tacitus. The Annals

58
1st-century battles
Chatti
Military history of Germany
Chatti
Hermunduri
50s conflicts